Gypsonoma phaeocremna is a species of moth of the family Tortricidae. It is found in China (Sichuan, Guizhou, Yunnan, Gansu, Shaanxi, Ningxia).

References

Moths described in 1937
Eucosmini